Martina Proeber (born 4 January 1963) is a German diver. She won a silver medal at the 1980 Summer Olympics in the 3 metre springboard event.

References

1963 births
Living people
Sportspeople from Rostock
German female divers
Olympic divers of East Germany
Divers at the 1980 Summer Olympics
Olympic silver medalists for East Germany
Olympic medalists in diving
Medalists at the 1980 Summer Olympics
20th-century German women